Memory Lane: The Best of McFly is the second greatest hits compilation released by the English pop rock band McFly. It was released on 26 November 2012 as a retrospective of the band's nine-year career to date, containing a number of the band's hit singles, but most notably not including "I Wanna Hold You", "Ultraviolet/The Ballad of Paul K", "Please, Please", "Sorry's Not Good Enough", "Baby's Coming Back", "Stay with Me" or "That's the Truth". The album was preceded by the release of a brand new single, "Love Is Easy", and includes four other new tracks, "Do Whatcha", "Down Down", "Mess Around You" and "Cherry Cola".

A deluxe edition of the album includes a number of the band's most famous B-sides, unreleased demo versions from previous album recording sessions and other popular tracks from their back catalogue of albums. The album was made available to pre-order from 13 October 2012. Personalised copies of the album can be created and ordered via Mixpixie.

Background
During the band's second theatre tour, the Keep Calm and Play Louder Tour, they premiered three brand new songs: "Do Whatcha", "Red" and "Touch the Rain". It was confirmed soon after by band member Tom Fletcher via Twitter that the band's next single would be the track "Red", as it had been very well received on the tour. However, in September 2012, the band travelled to the United States to play four dates in Los Angeles and New York, during which they premiered a fourth new single, "Love is Easy", and it was soon announced that this would in fact be released as the band's next single, instead of "Red", and that it would precede the release of the band's second retrospective release, Memory Lane: The Best of McFly. It was also announced that in promotion of the album, the band would be releasing their autobiography, Unsaid Things: Our Story. With the announcement of the track listing for Memory Lane in October 2012, "Love is Easy" and "Do Whatcha" were present, but "Red" and "Touch the Rain" were not, but instead had been held back for the band's sixth studio album, in favour of three other new tracks: "Cherry Cola", "Down Down" and "Mess Around You". "Love is Easy" was released on 11 November 2012, going on to peak at No. 10 on the UK Singles Chart, and was premiered on BBC Radio 2 Graham Norton at 10:55 on 20 October 2012. The music video for the track was premiered on 9 October 2012.

Track listing
The track listing of the album was confirmed on 11 October 2012, via Digital Spy. Disc two was originally set to contain the B-side track "Easy Way Out". However, pressings of the album do not contain the track, and it has been removed from all digital versions of the album, for reasons unknown. The standard version contains disc one only, and the deluxe version contains both discs.

Tour

In promotion of the album, McFly toured across the United Kingdom in April and May 2013 with 21 performances, with an extra show at Scarborough added in August. The tour ended with the biggest performance at Wembley Arena and was supported by The Vamps. There were originally eighteen shows but a further two more for Glasgow and Manchester were added and a date for Scarborough was also added for August and then another gig for June had been added for Gloucester Kingsholm stadium. Tickets went on sale from 8 December 2012 at 9am and the dates were first confirmed during the Super City: Battle of the Bands in November 2012.

Tour dates
19 April – Swindon Oasis
20 April – Birmingham Academy
22 April – Nottingham, Royal Centre
23 April – Reading, The Hexagon
25 April – Newcastle Academy
27 April – Glasgow SECC Clyde Auditorium
28 April – Glasgow SECC Clyde Auditorium
30 April – Sheffield City Hall
1 May – Leeds Academy
3 May – Manchester, Apollo
4 May – Manchester, Apollo^
6 May – Leicester, De Montfort Hall
7 May – Cambridge Corn Exchange
9 May – Bournemouth International Centre
10 May – Cardiff Motorpoint Arena
11 May – Wolverhampton Civic Hall
13 May – Bristol, Colston Hall
14 May – Portsmouth Guildhall
16 May – Brighton Centre
18 May – London, Wembley Arena
30 August – Scarborough Open Air Theatre

^ – Extra dates

Set list
 Memory Lane [a capella]
 That Girl
 Star Girl
 Transylvania
 Five Colours in Her Hair
 Falling in Love
 Room on the 3rd Floor
 Obviously
 Corrupted
 Nowhere Left To Run
 Lies
 I'll Be OK
 Bubblewrap
 Smile
 Shine A Light
 One for the Radio
 Memory Lane
Encore
 18. Love Is Easy
 19. All About You
 20. The Heart Never Lies

Notes
The opening was introduced with "Memory Lane" being played with the lyrics, 'So much has changed', repeated without any instruments before "That Girl" was played but, however, the whole song is played before the encore. Only the first half of "Transylvania" was played and "I'll Be OK" was played as a quieter version with only a piano.

Certifications

Release history

References

2012 greatest hits albums
McFly compilation albums